Mateusz Świdnicki (born 10 August 2001) is an international speedway rider from Poland.

Speedway career 
In 2020, he represented Poland in the U19 European Pairs Cup, where he won a bronze medal. On September 7, 2022 he became the Polish Junior Individual Speedway Championship.

In 2022, Świdnicki finished in 8th place during the World Under-21 Championship in the 2022 SGP2.

Major results

World individual Championship
2021 Speedway Grand Prix - 30th

References 

Living people
2001 births
Polish speedway riders